is a monorail train station on the Shōnan Monorail Enoshima Line in Kamakura, Kanagawa Prefecture, Japan. It is 5.5 kilometers from the northern terminus of the Shōnan Monorail Enoshima Line at Ōfuna Station. It is an elevated station with single side platform serving bidirectional traffic, and is unattended.

History
The station opened on July 1, 1971 as part of the line's second phase of construction, which extended its terminus to Shōnan-Enoshima Station.

Lines
Shōnan Monorail Company Ltd
Enoshima Line

Adjacent stations

External links
Shonan Monorail home page 

Railway stations in Kanagawa Prefecture
Railway stations in Japan opened in 1971
Shonan Monorail Enoshima Line
Buildings and structures in Kamakura, Kanagawa
Stations of Shonan Monorail